Neon Future IV is the sixth studio album by American DJ and producer Steve Aoki, succeeding his 2018 album Neon Future III. It was released on April 3, 2020, through Dim Mak Records. It contains collaborations with Lights (musician), Norwegian producer Alan Walker, Brazilian DJ Alok, Indonesian singer Agnez Mo, Australian musician Timmy Trumpet, German DJ Felix Jaehn, American DJs Slushii, Travis Barker and  Makj, Dutch DJs Ummet Ozcan, Dzeko and Dr. Phunk, and Dutch bands Showtek, Bassjackers and Going Deeper.

Background 
Steve Aoki first announced the album during an interview for EDM.com at the end of January 2019. According to him, it marks the continuation of Neon Future II and III that he wrote together. He announced that he was finishing Neon Future IV, which would contain "mega collaborations" and that he would release the following singles of the album one by one, before publishing the opus, which was originally planned to be unveiled in 2019. A few days after, he announced via Twitter that he was working for a song with American rapper Ty Dolla Sign, which will be included in Neon Future IV. The album availability date has been announced several months after the release of Neon Future III in November 2018, and two dates were defined, first in Spring 2019, then in September 2019. In June, during an interview for MusicTech, he confirmed that he was working on it and prevented that many new singles will be dropped in order to complement the upcoming album. During an interview for iHeartRadio about his song "Let It Be Me" released in September, Aoki said, "Neon Future IV is packed with collabs. Every song is gonna be [a] very interesting, diverse collab list of artists from all different kinds of worlds — which is how I love to do Neon Future. It's all about connecting with artists from all different walks of life." In November, he premiered his album during All Nippon Airways Celebration in New York. A few moments before his performance, he said, "It's a bit nerve wracking because I've never played it for anyone. Actually, some of these songs never heard the light of day outside my studio. So this is a big moment, and the moment's coming soon. The Neon Future IV album will be coming out soon, but people in this room tonight will be the first to ever hear what I've been working on for a long time." The DJ also confirmed that it will be released at the end of 2019, and then debuted a mix containing his previous tracks and seven unreleased songs – all of them are collaborations – which should appear in the album tracklist. Liz Kraker of EDM.com noted that they varied in subgenre with dance-pop, future bass, trap and moombahton. After the release of the track "2 in a Million" in December 2019, the album was announced for release in 2020.

Track listing 

Notes
  signifies a co-producer
  signifies a vocal producer
  signifies a  producer and vocal producer
  signifies a remix producer
  signifies a producer and remix producer

Charts

References

2020 albums
Steve Aoki albums
Dim Mak Records albums